The Siberian elm cultivar Ulmus pumila was known as 'Aurea' (selling name ™) was released by the Honze nursery in China shortly before the Beijing Olympics in 2008. Its former cultivarname was not accepted by E.N.A. and thus changed into ‘’Beijing Gold’’ although the species is a cultivar from U. pumila, it is falsely advertised as a 'Chinese Elm', which is U. parvifolia.

Description
‘’Beijing Gold’’ forms a dense shrub or small very broad tree growing to a height of < 6 m, bearing soft yellow foliage that retains its colour from early spring to early autumn.

Pests and diseases
See under Ulmus pumila.

Cultivation
The cultivar was introduced to the UK in 2008, but is not known to be in cultivation in North America.

Accessions

Europe
Grange Farm Arboretum, Sutton St. James, near Spalding, Lincs., UK. Acc. no. 692.
Netherlands Plant Collection Ulmus, Wijdemeren, North-Holland, Netherlands

Nurseries

Europe
Gardening Express , Chelmsford, UK
Marcopolo Plants , Boskoop, Netherlands
Noordplant Nurseries , Glimmen, Netherlands

Siberian elm cultivar
Ulmus articles missing images